The .17 Hornady Mach 2, or .17 HM2, is a rimfire cartridge introduced in 2004 by the ammunition manufacturer Hornady, following the successful launch in 2002 of the .17 HMR.  The .17 HM2 is based on the .22 Long Rifle "Stinger" case, necked down to .17 caliber (4.5 mm) and using a bullet weighing less than half the weight of a typical .22 Long Rifle bullet.

Performance
The weight of the bullet is a key part of achieving a very high velocity for a rimfire round. It weighs only 17 grains (1.10 g) vs 30-40 grains (1.94-2.59 g) of a typical .22 LR bullet. The .17 HM2 may or may not live up to its "Mach 2" name, depending on geographic location and conditions, with velocities out of a rifle of 2,100 ft/s (640 m/s).  The velocity is nearly double that of a standard .22 LR, which results in a much flatter trajectory out to its 175-yard (160 m) effective range.

Converting rifles

Since the .17 HM2 is based on the .22 LR, converting most bolt action firearms chambered in .22 LR to .17 HM2 requires only a barrel change.  The higher pressure makes conversion of semi-automatic firearms more difficult, as virtually all are blowback designs that are sensitive to pressure changes.  Conversion kits have appeared, and they replace the factory bolt or bolt handle with a heavier one to increase the bolt mass and compensate for the higher pressure.

See also
.17 PMC/Aguila
List of handgun cartridges
List of rifle cartridges
List of rimfire cartridges
Table of handgun and rifle cartridges
4 mm caliber

References

Further reading

External links
Eley
CCI

Pistol and rifle cartridges
Rimfire cartridges
Weapons and ammunition introduced in 2004